Stewart is a civil parish of Fitzroy County in New South Wales. It is located in Bellingen Shire.

References

Parishes of New South Wales
Mid North Coast